The Zhengzhou–Xixia Expressway, designated as S88 in Henan's expressway system, is  long regional expressway in Henan, China. Currently, the Zhengzhou–Yaoshan section (often referred to as Zhengyao Expressway) has been opened, the Yaoshan–Xixia section is still under construction.

History
The first section of the expressway, which is from Zhengzhou to Shirenshan (now Yaoshan), was opened on 21 December 2007. It was originally called Zhengshi Expressway (Zhengzhou–Shirenshan). After Shirenshan's renaming to Yaoshan in 2008, the expressway's name was also changed to Zhengyao Expressway (Zhengzhou–Yaoshan)

The Yaoshan–Luanchuan section commenced construction in late 2016, while the Luanchuan–Xixia section is still under planning.

Exit list
Only the opened Zhengzhou–Yaoshan section is listed.

References

Expressways in Henan
Transport in Henan
Expressways in Zhengzhou